The Powerhouse Museum is the major branch of the Museum of Applied Arts & Sciences (MAAS) in Sydney, the others being the historic Sydney Observatory at Observatory Hill, and the newer Museums Discovery Centre at Castle Hill. Although often described as a science museum, the Powerhouse has a diverse collection encompassing all sorts of technology including decorative arts, science, communication, transport, costume, furniture, media, computer technology, space technology and steam engines.

The museum has existed in various guises for over 125 years, previously named the Technological, Industrial and Sanitary Museum of New South Wales (1879–1882) and the  Technological Museum (August 1893 – March 1988).  the collection contains over 500,000 objects collected over the last 135 years, many of which are displayed or housed at the site it has occupied since 1988, and for which it is named – a converted electric tram power station in the Inner West suburb of Ultimo, originally constructed in 1902 and is a well-known and popular Sydney tourist destination. The Federation-style building is listed on the New South Wales Government's State Heritage Register.

The current building, designed by Lionel Glendenning for the Australian Bicentenary in 1988, won the Sir John Sulman Medal for architecture. It includes a specially installed reticulated steam system, run from the old boiler house, to drive the large, rare steam machines in its collection.

History

The Powerhouse Museum has its origins in a recommendation of the trustees of the Australian Museum in 1878 and the Sydney International Exhibition of 1879 and Melbourne International Exhibition of 1880.  The Sydney International Exhibition was held in the Garden Palace, a purpose-built exhibition building located in the grounds of the Royal Botanic Gardens. At the conclusion of the exhibition, the Australian Museum (Sydney's museum of natural history) appointed a committee to select the best exhibits with the intention of exhibiting them permanently in a new museum to be sited within the Garden Palace. The new museum was to be called The Technological, Industrial, and Sanitary Museum of New South Wales; its purpose was to exhibit the latest industrial, construction and design innovations with the intention of showing how improvements in the living standards and health of the population might be brought about.

In September 1882, before the new museum could be opened a fire completely destroyed the Garden Palace, leaving the museum's first curator, Joseph Henry Maiden with a collection consisting of only the most durable artefacts including a Ceylonese statue of an elephant carved in graphite that had miraculously survived the blaze despite a 5-storey plunge.

Maiden commenced rebuilding the collection, but for the subsequent decade the new museum found itself housed in a large tin shed in The Domain, a facility it shared with the Sydney Hospital morgue. The ever-present stench of decaying corpses was not the best advertisement for an institution dedicated to the promotion of sanitation.  Eventually – after intense lobbying – the museum was relocated to a three-storey building; a temporary home at the Agricultural Hall in the Domain, a new, purpose-built premises in Harris Street, Ultimo and was given a new name: the "Technological Museum".

The new location placed the museum adjacent to the Sydney Technical College, and as such it was intended to provide material inspiration to the students. As time passed, its name was changed to The Museum of Applied Arts and Sciences and it also established branches in some of New South Wales' main industrial and mining centres, including Broken Hill, Albury, Newcastle and Maitland. It also quickly outgrew the main Harris Street site and by 1978 the situation had become dire, with many exhibits literally stuffed into its attic, and left unexhibited for decades.

On 23 August 1978, Premier Neville Wran announced that the decrepit Ultimo Power Station, several hundred metres north of the Harris Street site had been earmarked as the museum's new permanent home along with the adjoining former Ultimo Tram Depot. The museum spent an interim period exhibiting as the Powerhouse Museum – Stage One in the nearby tram sheds before re-opening as the Powerhouse Museum at the new site on 10 March 1988. The main museum building contains five levels, three courtyards and a cafeteria, as well as some offices. Workshops, library, storage and additional office space is located in the annexed tram sheds (still known in-house as "Stage One"). The size and continually expanding nature of the museum's collection means that offsite storage facilities are also maintained.

The new Powerhouse made it possible to rehabilitate hundreds of treasures stored at Alexandria and "exhibit them for the first time in almost a century". In 1982, the museum incorporated the Sydney Observatory. The museum moved to 500 Harris Street in March 1988, and took its new name from the new location.

Following its closure as a working observatory in 1982, Sydney Observatory was incorporated into the Museum of Applied Arts and Sciences, as the museum was still formally known, though from 1988 this name was no longer used in marketing materials in favour of the Powerhouse Museum brand.

In January 2019 Lisa Havilah, former director of Carriageworks, took up the position of CEO of MAAS. She became the fourth head of MAAS in 5 years.

Heritage listing 
The statement of significance for the Federation building says the Powerhouse played a "major part in the 20th-century development of the Ultimo/Pyrmont area and in the wider heritage conservation movement in NSW." and it was part of the Darling Harbour Bicentennial citywide adaptation project, incorporated into "the transition of a major industrial location to a cultural, educational and tourism precinct".

Proposed closure and move

In February 2015, the State Government controversially announced that the Powerhouse Museum would be relocated to Parramatta. However this plan was reviewed, and an announcement from the NSW government in April 2017, suggested that the museum would stay in its current location. A decision to remain was announced on 18 July 2017. In 2018, the plan was revisited and the move was confirmed with a decision made to close the Ultimo site between June 2020, and early 2021. The final design for a new venue was unveiled in December 2019. The former site was to become a Broadway style theatre and fashion museum. In July 2020, the decision to close the site and relocate the collections was reversed.

The proposed new venue was larger than the old Powerhouse site in Ultimo, containing of 30,000 square metres, with about half (18,000 square metres) slated for exhibition and public space. The NSW Government promised to develop the new facility to international standards and engineered to present larger objects from the collection including the Catalina flying boat and Locomotive No.1 but proposals for lending the large items to different organisations across the state were in train since 2019, and concern persisted about risks, logistics and decontextualisation of exhibits.

The insecurity, the "deluge of controversy" and the impact of the COVID-19 pandemic on the arts and cultural heritage sector made planning extremely difficult.

Criticism of proposed closure and move 
The proposed closure and move attracted wide-ranging criticism from museum experts, architectural heritage and urban design experts, cultural and business leaders, and the public on a number of grounds, including loss of cultural heritage, risk and cost. One critic described the proposal as "akin to the British government relocating the Victoria and Albert Museum to Essex". The museum trust's director of conservation said "Parramatta should have its own distinctive museum", one not founded on the loss of another important one.

The main concerns expressed about the proposed move included that:

 it would involve significant cultural destruction of existing heritage, including the architectural heritage of the original building as well as 19th century Italianate villa in Parramatta, known as Willow Grove, and a row of 19th century terraces;
 the size and type of collection made its removal and/or relocation extremely expensive and risky;
 closing or selling it involved a serious "downgrading of public assets";
 there was ongoing public and expert opposition, a survey by the National Trust (NSW), and a green ban on the destruction of Willow Grove was imposed by the NSW arm of the Construction, Forestry, Maritime, Mining and Energy Union (CFMEU) and the New South Wales Nurses and Midwives' Association;
 the business case for a complete shutdown and move did not consider the option of leaving it at the current site;
 the new venue was designed to be more of an event space than a museum, as most of the 500,000 items in the collection could not be displayed in it, especially the very large ones, given that the design contained numerous cafes and bars, but no storage space, conservation laboratories, sufficient goods lifts or environmental standards appropriate to a museum;
 the proposed site for a new building was unsuitable as it is on a flood plain, which would affect the safety of the proposed undercroft and put patrons and collections at risk;
 the new building, scheduled to open in 2024, would not have been ready to display the collection until many years after closure of the original venue;
 the Ultimo building was purpose-built to meet the needs of its unique collection;
 a museum relocated out of the former Powerhouse would require a change of name;
 a better option was creating an additional museum on a different site in Parramatta to meet the needs of the local populace and allow more of the collection to be shown.

Responses to criticism of proposed closure and move 
On 4 July 2020, it was decided to keep and renovate the Ultimo building instead of demolishing it and relocating its collections, and build an additional venue in Parramatta. The NSW Premier said this would allow for "an outstanding visitor experience in the areas of technology, science, engineering and design at two major locations", and that like other large collections such as the Smithsonian museums in the United States, multiple centres would display the institution's collections. While Government Ministers argued the decision would be a "win-win" for Sydney and Parramatta, critics argued it would be a "lose-lose", with both cities losing important heritage. On 29 July 2020, the NSW government announced it had abandoned plans to relocate three of the Powerhouse Museum's biggest exhibits – the Boulton and Watt steam engine, the Locomotive No. 1, and the Catalina flying boat.

The planned three centres of Sydney's Powerhouse Museum were the existing building at Ultimo, the Parramatta riverside, Museum Discovery Centre at Castle Hill and the Sydney Observatory. The decision to keep Ultimo site was made in the context of increasing public awareness of the cultural damage that would be done by closing the Powerhouse, along with the severe impact of the COVID-19 pandemic on the arts and cultural heritage. The design of the Parramatta venue was subsequently amended by reducing the proposed presentation floor space and researcher apartments, along with a greater setback to the river. In March 2021, during heavy rains, the proposed area flooded for the second time in two years, and even with increased setback from the river, experts were concerned about irreparable damage from increased humidity to items in the collection, especially delicate ones made of paper, textile and wood.

Revised plans to move Willow Grove "brick by brick" also created further controversy, with the National Trust advising that dismantling a building of such fragile materials would be an expensive and "catastrophic" failure.

Exhibits 
The museum hosts a number of permanent exhibitions, including many concerning different modes of transport and communication.

Key attractions 
The Powerhouse Museum houses a number of unique exhibits including the oldest operational rotative steam engine in the world, the Whitbread Engine. Dating from 1785, it is one of only a handful remaining that was built by Boulton and Watt and was acquired from Whitbread's London Brewery in 1888. This engine was named a Historic Mechanical Engineering Landmark by the American Society of Mechanical Engineers in 1986.

Another important exhibit is Locomotive No. 1, the first steam locomotive to haul a passenger train in New South Wales, built by Robert Stephenson & Company in 1854. The most popular exhibit is arguably "The Strasburg Clock Model", built in 1887 by a 25-year-old Sydney watchmaker named Richard Smith. It is a working model of the famous Strasbourg astronomical clock in Strasbourg Cathedral (which at that time was called Strassburg or Strasburg). Smith had never actually seen the original when he built it but worked from a pamphlet which described its timekeeping and astronomical functions.

The Catalina Flying Boat 'Frigate Bird II' on display in the museum is the one that Sir Patrick Gordon Taylor flew on the first flight from Australia to South America in which he brought home 29 soldiers from New Guinea in 1945. It is the largest suspended plane in any museum in the world, and an example of the most successful flying boat ever introduced and one that was important in connecting Australia by air with the rest of the world after World War II. After involvement in the air-sea rescue squadron, the museum's specimen flew from the Rose Bay flying boat base across the Pacific Ocean on the first uncharted air route between Sydney and Valparaiso, Chile. The use of Catalina flying boats by Qantas Empire Airways after World War II was significant in the development of Australia's commercial air services.

Transport 

The transport exhibition looks at transport through the ages, from horse-drawn carts through steam engines, cars and planes to the latest hybrid technology. On display is Steam Locomotive No. 1243, which served for 87 years, oldest contractor built locomotive in Australia. It stands beside a mock-up of a railway platform, on the other side of which is the Governor of New South Wales's railway carriage, of the 1880s. Also in this exhibition is the original Central railway station destination board, relocated to the museum in the 1980s when the station was refurbished.

Powerhouse Museum restored the locomotives 3830, restored to operational order in 1997 and 3265, restored in 2009 after 40 years off the rails. Sydney's last Hansom Cab was donated to the museum by its driver, who left it at the gates of the Harris Street building. There is also a horse-drawn bus and collection of motorbikes. Suspended aeroplanes, which can be viewed from balconies, include the Catalina flying boat and a Queenair Scout, the first Flying Doctor Service plane. Among the cars is a 1913 Sheffield Simplex, one of only 8 in the world. A four-minute film shows old footage of public transport.

The Powerhouse Museum also has Sydney trams C11 (1898), O805 (1909), R1738 (1938. 1st of its type), steam tram motor 28A, hearse car 27s and Manly horse car 292.

The steam revolution 
This exhibition is remarkable in that nearly all of the engines on display are fully operational and are regularly demonstrated working on steam power. Together with the Boulton and Watt engine, and the museum's locomotives, steam truck and traction engines, they are a unique working collection tracing the development of steam power from the 1770s to the 1930s. Engines on display include an 1830s Maudslay engine, a Ransom and Jeffries agricultural engine and the Broken Hill Fire Brigade's horse-drawn pump-engine. The museum owns a collection of mechanical musical instruments, of which the fairground barrel organ is located in the steam exhibition, where it is powered by a small fairground engine.

Time and space 

The most popular exhibit is arguably the museum's model of the Strasbourg astronomical clock in Strasbourg Cathedral (which at that time was called Strassburg or Strasburg). The reproduction is a working model built between 1887 and 1889 by a 25-year-old Sydney watchmaker named Richard Bartholomew Smith, who had never actually seen the original when he built it but worked from a pamphlet which described its timekeeping and astronomical functions. The museum acquired it in 1890. Made from carved and painted wood with gold painted detailing, the clock displays the position of the planets, the days of the month, solar time, lunar phases and analog time.

The Space exhibition looks at space and discoveries relating to it. It includes a life size model space-shuttle cockpit. It has a feature on Australian satellites and joins the Transport exhibit through an underground temporary exhibit walkway and two side entrances.

The Powerhouse Museum has a 7 1⁄2-inch Merz Telescope that was manufactured in 1860–1861.

Environment
The EcoLogic exhibition focuses on the challenges facing the environment, human impact, and ways and technologies to stop this effect. There is a house setup called Ecohouse where people toggle light variables to see the outcome as well as other energy use simulators and a 'ecological footprint' game. The exhibition includes a section of a tree with a time line marked on its rings, dating back to the 17th century.

Computers and connections 
The 'Interface: people, machines, design' explores how humans have been impacted by technology. A gallery of computing technology from the typewriter to the Tamagotchi. It explores successful and not-so successful design approaches made in the computing technology world.

Experimentations 
"Experimentations" is a science exhibition and contains interactive displays demonstrating aspects of magnetism, light, electricity, motion and the senses. These include a machine that explains how chocolate is made and lets one taste four 'stages' of chocolate. There is a full-sized model of the front of a firetruck that measures the pedal-power used to sound its horn and lights, and a hand-powered model railway using a magnetic system to provide electric current to the track. One of the most popular features is a plasma ball that shows the electric current through the glowing gas inside it, and changes when touched.

Art and industry 

The museum holds an extensive and significant collection of Doulton ware and other ceramics, as well as industrial equipment and industrial design, such as furniture.

Temporary exhibitions

Australian popular culture 

Various exhibitions have paid tribute to Australian popular culture. Some of these have included On the box: great moments in Australian television 1956–2006 tribute to 50 years of Australian television and The 80s are back which looks back at life in Australia in the 1980s.

Arts 
Arts oriented temporary exhibitions have included the Fabergé exhibition, the Treasures of Palestine exhibition, the Strictly Mardi Gras exhibition, the Christian Dior exhibition, the Audrey Hepburn exhibition, Kylie: an exhibition – a tribute to Kylie Minogue and her contribution to music, stage and screen, featuring many of her costumes. An exhibition about Diana, Princess of Wales, called Diana: a celebration included items from the collection at her ancestral home, Althorp, including her wedding gown, family jewellery and film of Diana as a child.

Harry Potter: The Exhibition in 2011–2012 was another popular exhibition, showcasing real costumes and sets from the eight Harry Potter films including the golden snitch, Nimbus 2000 and the Firebolt broomsticks, and various artefacts associated with all of the main characters.

In 2011, to celebrate the 20th anniversary of The Wiggles, the Powerhouse mounted The Wiggles Exhibition, which exhibited memorabilia from the group as well as from The Cockroaches, since two of the group were previously members of The Cockroaches. Due to its popularity, the exhibition was kept as one of the museum's permanent exhibitions.

Cinema themed 
Since 1988, the Powerhouse hosted a number of large temporary exhibitions, including ones based on popular cinema franchises such as Star Trek, The Lord of the Rings, and the Star Wars: Where Science Meets Imagination exhibition, showing models, props and costumes from all six Star Wars films, together with recent advances in technology that are turning fantasy into reality.

Museums Discovery Centre
About 95 percent of the Museum of Applied Arts and Sciences collection is maintained in storage at any one time. From late 2004, 60 percent of this was moved to a new  site in the northwestern Sydney suburb of Castle Hill.

See also 
 German Museum of Technology – rail, maritime, aviation technology
 Musée des Arts et Métiers , Paris – scientific and cultural objects, collected since 18th century
 Museum of Science and Industry (Chicago) – transport (ships, trains, air, space)
 National Air and Space Museum, Washington, D.C.

References

Further reading
 Treasure Trove: 125 Years of the Powerhouse Museum by Steve Meacham, Sydney Morning Herald (Spectrum), 18–19 September 2004, pp 1–4
 
 Museum of Applied Arts and Science Annual Report

External links

 
 
 
 

Museums in Sydney
Design museums in Australia
Science museums in Australia
Technology museums in Australia
Steam museums
Transport museums in New South Wales
Buildings and structures awarded the Sir John Sulman Medal
Ultimo, New South Wales